Gosselin (Tutor of) v Quebec (AG), 2005 SCC 15, [2005] 1 SCR 238 is a leading case of the Supreme Court of Canada on the constitutional protection of minority language rights under section 23 of the Canadian Charter of Rights and Freedoms. The case was part of a trilogy of minority language rights cases including Solski (Tutor of) v Quebec (AG), 2005 SCC 14 and Okwuobi v Lester B Pearson School Board; Casimir v Quebec (AG); Zorrilla v Quebec (AG), 2005 SCC 16.

A number of French-speaking families who wanted their children educated in English but did not qualify under the Charter of the French Language for English schooling challenged the French Charter as a violation of their equality rights under sections 10 and 12 of the Quebec Charter of Human Rights and Freedoms.

The Court rejected the claim. It held that the parents were not protected under the minority language rights provision in section 23 of the Canadian Charter. The Court also found that the equality right cannot be used to invalidate other rights under the Constitution; consequently there was no violation.

See also
 List of Supreme Court of Canada cases (McLachlin Court)

External links
 

Canadian Charter of Rights and Freedoms case law
Supreme Court of Canada cases
Minority schools
Bilingualism in Canada
2005 in Canadian case law
Quebec language policy
Language case law